Biomphalaria barthi is a species of air-breathing freshwater snail, an aquatic pulmonate gastropod mollusk in the family Planorbidae, the ram's horn snails.

This species is endemic to Ethiopia.

References

Biomphalaria
Endemic fauna of Ethiopia
Gastropods described in 1973
Taxonomy articles created by Polbot